is a station on the Tokyo Monorail in Ōta, Tokyo, Japan. Its name literally means "Logistics Center", and comes from its location near various warehousing and forwarding facilities, including Tokyo's primary rail freight terminal, Tokyo Freight Terminal.

Lines

Adjacent stations

History
It gained its current name in January 1972 (originally transliterated as Ryūtsū Sentā, but changed in 1992). Rapid services began calling here on 18 March 2007.

Passenger statistics
In fiscal 2011, the station was used by an average of 15,948 passengers daily.

Surrounding area
 Tokyo Ryutsu Center (TRC)
 Heiwajima Park

References

External links

 Tokyo Monorail station information 

Tokyo Monorail Haneda Line
Stations of Tokyo Monorail
Railway stations in Tokyo
Railway stations in Japan opened in 1969